Aulis Kähkönen (10 December 1930 – 20 June 2016) was a Finnish swimmer. He competed in the men's 200 metre breaststroke at the 1952 Summer Olympics.

References

External links
 

1930 births
2016 deaths
Finnish male breaststroke swimmers
Olympic swimmers of Finland
Swimmers at the 1952 Summer Olympics
Sportspeople from Vyborg